Dario Cantarelli (born 16 September 1945) is an Italian actor.

Biography
He began his acting career on stage in 1973, playing roles in plays by William Shakespeare (Antony and Cleopatra), Eduardo De Filippo (Filumena Marturano), Molière, Luigi Pirandello, Harold Pinter and Bertolt Brecht. During those same years, he began acting in movies, directed by filmmakers such as Nanni Moretti, Marco Bellocchio, Paolo Sorrentino and the Taviani brothers.

Filmography

References

External links

1945 births
Living people
Italian film actors